Arc'teryx is a Canadian high-end design company specializing in outdoor apparel and equipment headquartered in North Vancouver, British Columbia. It focuses on technical apparel for mountaineering and Alpine sports, including related accessories. The company's name and logo reference the Archaeopteryx, the transitional fossil of early dinosaurs to modern dinosaurs (birds). Arc'teryx is known for their waterproof Gore-Tex shell jackets, knitwear, and down parkas. 

Founded in 1989 as Rock Solid, the company re-branded in 1991 as Arc'teryx to produce outerwear and climbing gear for the Coast Mountains in Canada. The company was sold to Salomon Group in 2001 and Amer Sports in 2005. Arc'teryx maintains two divisions: Veilance, their luxury streetwear retailer and LEAF, their retailer of technical gear for law enforcement and military forces. 

The company is a major influence in the "gorpcore" and "normcore" fashion movements, the wearing of minimalist, outdoor apparel in urban settings.

History
Originally named "Rock Solid" by founder Dave Lane, the company's first line of products was climbing gear. Dave Lane sold his 50% interest to Blair Murdoch and Tim Duholke who became silent partners in 1989. Then-principal Jeremy Guard changed the company name to Arc'teryx in 1991 to reflect the company's vision of creating disruptive "evolutionary" innovation within the outdoor products industry. Guard was president and principal of the company from 1991 to 2001. Using a heat laminate (thermolamination) technology, the partners designed and marketed the Vapor harness, which would become the company's most popular item. In 1993, after a series of relocations and staff additions, Arc'teryx released the Bora backpack using the same Vapor technology. In 1996, the company introduced technical apparel featuring Gore-Tex after obtaining a license from W. L. Gore & Associates. Arc'teryx re-located its headquarters to Burnaby, British Columbia in 1999 and then to North Vancouver in 2005.

In 2001, Arc'teryx was purchased by Salomon Group, a French subsidiary of the German retailer Adidas. In 2005, Arc'teryx was sold to Finnish retailer Amer Sports. In 2019, Chinese retailer Anta Sports bought a controlling stake (56%) in Amer. The Arc'teryx head office is located in North Vancouver and harnesses, backpacks, and other apparel is made in its own factory in New Westminster, BC. As their apparel line expanded Arc'teryx began manufacturing in international markets, specifically in China, the Philippines, Vietnam, Bangladesh, El Salvador, Laos, and Greece.

Jon Hoerauf joined the company as president in 2012, assuming the additional role of general manager in 2016. During the early 2020s, Arc'teryx co-produced items with high-fashion brands and designers which expanded their consumer market beyond outdoor enthusiasts.

Divisions

Veilance  
Arc'teryx launched their luxury formal urban-wear brand in 2009, branded as Arc'teryx Veilance.

LEAF 
Arc'teryx's Law Enforcement and Armed Forces (LEAF) line is aimed at the military and police market. In the consumer and Internet market, it is often referred to as "military birds". Some of the collections are designed for their civilian counterparts, while others, such as Arc'teryx's Tango and Charlie backpacks, feature camouflage designs that are entirely geared toward the military. In contrast, military bird products use dark colors and military colors. Only a handful of products, such as the Alpha jacket, are currently made in Canada, while the rest, such as Assault Shirt, are made overseas, such as in El Salvador and Vietnam.

Subculture 
Arc'teryx has become widely popular in the street fashion scene and Internet culture. The theft ("racking") of Arc'teryx and other Gore-Tex items is considered to be part of the street subculture. It is seen as a high-end status symbol among youth, "just shy of Stone Island and Moncler." The Atlantic noted the brand as selling "premium-tier outdoorsiness" while the Financial Times noted one of their largest demographics as "urbanites" in 2022. 

Labeled a cult brand by Fast Company in 2021, Arc'teryx is worn by "[both] hikers and hype-beasts" according to The New York Times. 

The company is a major influence in the "gorpcore" and "normcore" fashion movements – the wearing of minimalist, outdoor apparel in urban settings, along with Mammut, REI, Marmot and Patagonia.

Throughout 2022, a TikTok trend emerged where individuals would shower, fully clothed with an Arc'teryx jacket, as British rapper YT's song "Arc'teryx" played on background.

See also 

 Patagonia, The North Face, and Mammut
 Moncler, Canada Goose, and Stone Island 
 Streetwear and minimalist fashion 
 List of outdoor industry parent companies

References

External links
 

2010s fashion
Camping equipment manufacturers
Canadian companies established in 1989
Clothing brands of Canada
Clothing companies established in 1989
Clothing companies of Canada
Companies based in Vancouver
Climbing and mountaineering equipment companies
Outdoor clothing brands
Retail companies established in 1989
1989 establishments in British Columbia

de:Amer Sports#Arc'teryx